Li Xintian (January 1929 – 3 July 2019) was a Chinese novelist best known for his novels The Sparkling Red Star and Two Little Fighters.

Biography
Li was born in Suining County, Jiangsu Province, in January 1929. He started to publish works in 1953. His first stage play, Little Eagle, was published in 1961. That same year, his novellas Two Little Fighters was published. This was made into a phenomenally successful film in 1978. After graduating from East China Military and Political University, he joined the People's Liberation Army, becoming a civilian cadre in Jinan Military Region. His most influential work The Sparkling Red Star was published in 1970, and was adapted into a successful film. In 1979 he joined the China Writers Association. He died in Jinan, capital of east China's Shandong province, on July 3, 2019.

Works

Novel
 Dreaming for 3000 years
 Thirty Years of Marriage
 Bridge in Dream
 A Pulsating Flame
 Ten Self-portraits

Novellas
 Two Little Fighters
 The Sparkling Red Star
 Blue Star on the Roof

Screenplay
 Sparkling Red Star (1974)

References

1929 births
Writers from Xuzhou
2019 deaths
People's Republic of China novelists
People of the Republic of China
Chinese children's writers